Charles "CJ" Cortalano (born 26 June 1982) is a professional rugby league footballer who plays for the United States.

He plays for and coaches the White Plains Wombats.

References

External links
2017 RLWC profile

1982 births
Living people
Rugby league second-rows
United States national rugby league team players
White Plains Wombats coaches
White Plains Wombats players